Statistics of Qatar Stars League for the 2004–05 season.

Overview
It was contested by 10 teams, and Al-Gharafa Sports Club won the championship.

League standings

References
Qatar - List of final tables (RSSSF)

2004–05 in Asian association football leagues
2004–05 in Qatari football